Hear No Evil is a 1982 made-for-television-film directed by Harry Falk Jr. and written by Tom Lazarus. The TV film stars Gil Gerard, Bernie Casey, Wings Hauser, Mimi Rogers, Christina Hart, Brion James, Ron Karabatsos, Mickey Jones, Raven De La Croix, and Robert Dryer.

Plot
After a cop becomes deaf in a fight, he tries to break up a drug ring run by bikers.

Cast
 Gil Gerard as Dragon
 Bernie Casey as Monday
 Wings Hauser as Garrard
 Mimi Rogers as Meg
 Christina Hart as Sheila Green
 Brion James as Billy Boy Burns
 Ron Karabatsos as Lt. Lew Healy
 Mickey Jones as Blackman
 Raven De La Croix as Candy Burns
 Robert Dryer as Vinnie Holzer
 William Paterson as Minister
 John G. Scanlon as Summers
 Parker Whitman as Riles
 Jana Winters as Hooker
 Joe Bellan as Cabbie
 Denise Kerwin as Judy
 Charles Bouvier as Wilkes
 Steve Burton as Plainclothesman
 Sam Conti as Sonny
 Cab Covayas Hit Man
 W. Scott Devenney as Rachmil
 Chuck Dorsett as Dr. Larsen
 Paul Drake as TD
 Julianna Field as Rico
 Emily Heebner as Vicki
 Bruce Mackey as Captain Shelhart
 Gary Pettinger as Wrigley
 Janet Raney as Terri
 Linda Vee as TV Announcer
 Danelle Hand as Suzanne
 Daniel Selby as Jack

Production
Hear No Evil is based on the true story of William O. "Bill" Zerby, a former Marine who, as a Solano County Sherriff's Office narcotics detective, aggressively perused members of the Hells Angels suspected of producing and distributing methamphetamine in the San Francisco Bay Area. Zerby was injured, suffered severe hearing loss and was forced to retire from his law enforcement agency as a result of an explosive device detonated as he was entering his car in front of his home on January 30, 1978. He was en route to court for a prehearing in the methamphetamine possession trial of Oakland Hells Angels chapter vice-president James Ezekiel "Jim-Jim" Brandes at the time. Brandes, who had previously been found to be in possession of a military handbook on booby traps and an address book containing the address, phone number and the license-plate number of Zerby when he was arrested on drug charges by Zerby and another detective on November 14, 1977, stated to a reporter for Rolling Stone magazine in or around November 1978 that "Zerby drew a line and stepped over it. I don't take that from anybody in the streets, and I sure ain't gonna take that from him. I don't let nobody come around and shove me around. I don't think anyone does if he's a man." The following year, Brandes and Kenneth Jay "K.O." Owen, a member of the Vallejo Hells Angels who had previously been arrested after a raid on his home led by Zerby uncovered narcotics and prohibited firearms on June 21, 1977, were charged with the attempted murder of Zerby as part of a racketeering case. Brandes and Owen were ultimately acquitted of the attempt on Zerby's life. Brandes later committed suicide by hanging himself in prison circa 1994. Owen died July 4, 2016, and Zerby died in 2021 at the age of seventy-nine.

Producer Paul Pompian heard of the Zerby incident while filming a TV pilot in San Francisco and decided to pursue the idea of translating the events into a teleplay. Paul Pompian Productions and MGM Television produced the television film which could have become a television series.

Reception

Critical response
Film critic John J. O'Connor of  The New York Times wrote in his review: "TRAINING for a new gimmick in the old police-drama formula, Hear No Evil, tomorrow's television movie on CBS, Channel 2, at 9, comes up with a deaf cop." Staff of the Pittsburgh Post-Gazette wrote: "Gil Gerard as Bill Dragon in a routine cop drama with a banal script and what only approximates acting. Even the central gimmick of permanently deafening the hero in an explosion seems to have been transferred by rubbings from ancient stones."

References

Citations

Sources

External links
 

1982 television films
1982 films
American drama television films
Outlaw biker films
Films directed by Harry Falk (director)
1980s English-language films
1980s American films
Films about disability